Doymenj or doymaj is a snack food of Azerbaijan, made of crushed cherries with herbs and salt. It is common in the northwestern zone of Azerbaijan (Gabala, Shaki, etc.).

Ingredients 

 Cherry plum (solid green or red) - 1 kg
 Garlic - 2 teeth
 Basil - 1/3 bunch
 Coriander - 1/3 bunch
 Salt - to taste

Preparation 

Wash and chop (or crush) the cherry plums in the form of cubes. Chop garlic, basil and coriander in very small pieces and add into the cherry plums. Then add the salt and mix together.

References 

Хелифазаде Джабир. Дары Азербайджанской национальной кухни. Баку 2006

External links 
 Recipe - Baku Magazine
 Azərbaycan kulinariya kitabı

Azerbaijani cuisine
Azerbaijani inventions
Azerbaijani words and phrases
Middle Eastern cuisine